Franklin Township is one of the fourteen townships of Mercer County, Ohio, United States.  The 2000 census found 2,303 people in the township, 2,112 of whom lived in the unincorporated portions of the township.

Geography
Located in the southeastern part of the county, it borders the following townships:
Jefferson Township - north
Saint Marys Township, Auglaize County - east
German Township, Auglaize County - southeast
Marion Township - south
Butler Township - west

The village of Montezuma is located in northwestern Franklin Township.

Name and history
Franklin Township was organized in 1841. It is one of twenty-one Franklin Townships statewide.

Government
The township is governed by a three-member board of trustees, who are elected in November of odd-numbered years to a four-year term beginning on the following January 1. Two are elected in the year after the presidential election and one is elected in the year before it. There is also an elected township fiscal officer, who serves a four-year term beginning on April 1 of the year after the election, which is held in November of the year before the presidential election. Vacancies in the fiscal officership or on the board of trustees are filled by the remaining trustees.

References

External links
County website

Townships in Mercer County, Ohio
Townships in Ohio